Gwilym is a Welsh given name and surname, related to William, Guillaume, and others in a number of other languages.

Given name:
Dafydd ap Gwilym (1315–1350), Welsh poet
Eurfyl ap Gwilym (born 1944), Welsh Plaid Cymru politician
Gwilym ab Ieuan Hen (1440–1480), Welsh language poet
Gwilym Davies (minister) CBE (1879–1955), Welsh Baptist minister
Gwilym Edwards (1881–1963), Welsh Presbyterian minister
Gwilym Ellis Lane Owen (1922–1982), Welsh philosopher
Gwilym Emyr Owen III (born 1960), American singer/songwriter
Gwilym Gibbons (born 1971), British arts leader
Gwilym Jenkins (1933–1982), British statistician and systems engineer
Gwilym Jones (born 1947), British Conservative politician
Gwilym Kessey (1919–1986), Australian cricketer
Gwilym Lee (born 1983), British Actor
Gwilym Lloyd George, 1st Viscount Tenby (1894–1967), politician and UK cabinet minister
Gwilym Thomas Mainwaring (1941–2019), Welsh rugby player
Gwilym Owen Williams (1913–1990), Anglican Archbishop of Wales from 1971 to 1982
Gwilym Prys Davies, Baron Prys-Davies, Welsh politician
Gwilym Puw (William Pugh) (1618–1689), Welsh Catholic poet and Royalist officer
Gwilym R. Jones (1903–1993), awarded three literary awards at the National Eisteddfod of Wales
Gwilym Rhyfel (fl. 12th century), Welsh language poet and warrior
Gwilym Roberts (1928–2018), British Labour Party politician
Gwilym Simcock (born 1981), British pianist and composer
Gwilym Tew (1460–1480), Welsh language poet and manuscript copyist
Gwilym Tilsley (1911–1997), Welsh poet
William Rees (Gwilym Hiraethog) (1802–1883), Welsh poet and author
William Thomas (Gwilym Marles) (1834–1878), Welsh minister and poet

Surname: 
Gwynn ap Gwilym (1950–2016), Welsh language poet, novelist, editor and translator
Lisa Gwilym (born 1975), Welsh broadcaster
Lowri Gwilym (1955–2010), Welsh television and radio producer
Meinir Gwilym (born 1983), Welsh-language pop and folk singer
Mike Gwilym (born 1949), Welsh actor
Robert Gwilym (born 1956), Welsh actor
Tich Gwilym (1951–2005), Welsh guitarist

See also
Gwilym, Welsh-language pop rock group

Surnames of Welsh origin
Welsh masculine given names